Elena Dementieva was the defending champion, but lost in the semifinals to Martina Hingis in a rematch of the previous year's final.

Hingis went on to win the title, defeating Ana Ivanovic in the final 6–4, 6–2. This tournament is known for being the last that Hingis won on the singles WTA tour.

Seeds
The top four seeds received a bye into the second round.

Draw

Finals

Top half

Bottom half

Notes
The winner will receive $182,000 and 430 ranking points.
The runner-up will receive $97,800 and 300 ranking points.
The last direct acceptance was Elena Vesnina (ranked 47th).
The Players' Representative was Ai Sugiyama.

References

External links
Draw

Pan Pacific Open
Toray Pan Pacific Open - Singles
2007 Toray Pan Pacific Open